Caroline Leigh Gascoigne (gas-koin′; , Smith; 2 May 1813 – 11 June 1883) was a 19th-century English poet and novelist. She published Temptation (1839), Evelyn Harcourt (1842), Dr. Harold's Note-Book (1869), and other works in prose and verse.

Biography

Caroline Leigh Smith was born 2 May 1813 in London, England. She was the daughter of MP John Smith, and his third wife Emma Leigh. Her early years were spent at her father's estate, Dale Park in Sussex. Her father was a rich banker but he was accidentally poisoned by his nearly-blind wife, who gave him an overdose of laudanum. Her elder half brothers were the MPs John Abel Smith and Martin Tucker Smith.

Gascoigne began writing fiction and poetry at an early age. In 1834, she married Lt.Col. (later, General) Ernest Frederick Gascoigne, MP for Liverpool, and there were three children from this union. 

Caroline Leigh Gascoigne died on 11 June 1883.

Selected works

Poems
 Belgravia (1851)
 Recollections of the Crystal Palace (1852)
 England's Heroes! (1855)

Novels
 Temptation, or, a wife's perils (1839)
 The school for wives (1839)
 Evelyn Harcourt (1842)
 Spencer's Cross Manor House, a tale for young people (1852)
 The Next Door Neighbours (1855)
 Doctor Harold (1865)

Short stories 
 My aunt Prue's railway journey (1865)
 Dr. Harold's Note-Book (1869)
 In Memoriam (of General E. F. Gascoigne). (1878)

Gallery

References

Bibliography

External links
 

1813 births
1883 deaths
19th-century English novelists
19th-century English poets
19th-century English women writers
Writers from London
English women novelists
English women poets
Caroline